The 1976–77 Iraqi National Clubs First Division was the 3rd season of the competition since its foundation in 1974. Due to scheduling difficulties, the season had to be cut short during round 18 of 22, with several postponed games from previous rounds. The Iraq Football Association decided to annul the results from the second half of the season, using the league table at the halfway stage of the campaign (when each team had played each other once) as the final standings, and crowned Al-Zawraa as the champions for their second consecutive league title.

Al-Zawraa lost one of their four games from the second half of the season 3–2 against Al-Baladiyat, and Al-Jamiea lost one of their games in the second half of the season 3–2 against Al-Zawraa, but because the second half of the season was annulled, Al-Zawraa and Al-Jamiea both finished the season without a single loss.

League table

Results

Season statistics

Top scorers

Hat-tricks

References

External links
 Iraq Football Association

Iraqi Premier League seasons
Iraq
1